Bubulcus is a genus of herons in the family Ardeidae.

The genus Bubulcus was introduced in 1855 by the French naturalist Charles Lucien Bonaparte with the western cattle egret as the type species. The genus name is from Latin and means "cowherd". The genus contains two species:

Some taxonomic authorities lump both species together, calling them cattle egrets, and making the genus monotypic.

References

External links
 
 

 
Bird genera
Taxa named by Charles Lucien Bonaparte